Kostas Maloumidis (born 4 March 1956 in Greece) is a former football supporting striker.
He played for AEL and Iraklis.
His last team in his career was Edessaikos.

International career
Maloumidis appeared in three matches for the senior Greece national football team from 1983 to 1984.

References

External links

1956 births
Greek footballers
Greece international footballers
Super League Greece players
Iraklis Thessaloniki F.C. players
Athlitiki Enosi Larissa F.C. players
Living people
Edessaikos F.C. players
Association football forwards
Footballers from Edessa, Greece